Tim Wuttke (born 15 August 1987 in Jena) is a German retired football defender who played in the 3. Liga for Carl Zeiss Jena.

References

1987 births
Living people
German footballers
FC Carl Zeiss Jena players
3. Liga players
Association football defenders
Sportspeople from Jena